Cyron is both a given name and a surname. Notable people with the name include:

 Cyron Brown (born 1975), American football player
 Cyron Melville (born 1984) Danish actor and musician
 Ryszard Cyroń (born 1965), Polish football player

Polish-language surnames